The men's triple jump event was part of the track and field athletics programme at the 1936 Summer Olympics. The competition was held on August 6, 1936. Thirty-one athletes from 19 nations competed. The maximum number of athletes per nation had been set at 3 since the 1930 Olympic Congress. The final was won by Naoto Tajima of Japan with a world-record jump. It was Japan's third consecutive gold medal in the men's triple jump; as of the 2016 Games, it is the last gold medal Japan has won in the event. Masao Harada's silver medal made it the second Games in which Japan put two men on the podium in the event. Jack Metcalfe of Australia (whose record Tajima broke) earned bronze, Australia's first medal in the event since 1924.

Background

This was the 10th appearance of the event, which is one of 12 athletics events to have been held at every Summer Olympics. Returning jumpers from the 1932 Games were bronze medalist Kenkichi Oshima of Japan, eighth-place finisher Rolland Romero of the United States, and eleventh-place finisher Onni Rajasaari of Finland. World record holder Jack Metcalfe of Australia competed, threatening the Japanese dominance of the event. Oshima had won the triple jump at the 1934 Far East Championship, with Masao Harada second. Naoto Tajima had won the long jump then, and also came into this event as the 1936 Olympic bronze medalist in the long jump.

Chile, the Republic of China, Colombia, Iceland, Poland, and Yugoslavia each made their first appearance in the event. The United States competed for the 10th time, having competed at each of the Games so far.

Competition format

The competition introduced what would eventually become the standard two-round format, though at the time it was described as a three-round format. In the qualifying round (or "elimination trials"), each jumper received three attempts to reach the qualifying distance of 14.00 metres. Those who did advanced to the final round. In the final round, each jumper took three jumps (the "semifinal"). The top six after that received a further three jumps (the "final"), with the best of the six to count.

Records

These were the standing world and Olympic records (in metres) prior to the 1928 Summer Olympics.

Naoto Tajima set the new world and Olympic records with 16.00 metres in his fourth jump of the final.

Schedule

Results

Qualifying

The distances jumped in the qualifying round are not known. Those who advanced jumped further than 14.00 metres; those who did not advance jumped shorter than that.

Final

References

Athletics at the 1936 Summer Olympics
Triple jump at the Olympics
Men's events at the 1936 Summer Olympics